John Randolph Wilder (March 18, 1816 – November 1, 1879) was an American businessman based in Savannah, Georgia, where he was a prominent civic leader, cotton merchant and planter. His shipping and cotton exporting houses were regarded as some of the leading businesses in Savannah. He was also a slave-owner.

Life and career 
A descendent of Captain Thomas Wilder, who served in King William's War, Wilder was born in Leicester, Massachusetts, to John Wilder and Lucinda A. Washburn.

He married Anna Drucilla Lewis in 1840.

After moving to Savannah, Georgia, Wilder went into the cotton business with his only child, son Joseph John, who was born on January 5, 1844. Joseph continued the business after his father's death; it was known for a period as Wilder & Fullerton, then J. J. Wilder & Co.

In 1868, Wilder and his family purchased what is now known as Mercer House, in Savannah's Monterey Square, from General Hugh W. Mercer, great-grandfather of Savannahian songwriter Johnny Mercer.

He became consul of the Russian government in Savannah, a role which his son later inherited.

Wilder studied in Germany during much of the American Civil War of 1861–1865.

Death 
Wilder died in Marietta, Georgia, on November 1, 1879, aged 63. He was interred in Savannah's Laurel Grove Cemetery, alongside his wife, who preceded him in death by two years.

References

External links 

 John R. Wilder at a grave-finding website

1816 births
1879 deaths
American businesspeople
People from Savannah, Georgia
People from Leicester, Massachusetts
American slave owners